Smoo Cave is a large combined sea cave and freshwater cave in Durness in Sutherland, Highland, Scotland.  The cave name is thought to originate from the Norse '' or '', meaning a hole or hiding-place.

Geology 

Smoo Cave was formed within Early Ordovician dolomites of the Durness Group (also known as the Durness Limestone).  The cave has formed along the boundary between the light grey Sangomore Formation and the dark grey, mottled Sailmhor Formation (sometimes called Leopard Rock), both of which form part of the Durness Group succession.  These horizons close to the formation boundary are characterised by large and abundant chert nodules which can be found all along the inner stream chamber where they have been left behind after dissolution of the surrounding dolomite.  

The cave was formed along two geological lines of weakness by a combination of erosion from the sea and an inland underground stream which has formed the innermost chambers.  Upstream of the Allt Smoo which runs into the cave, impermeable quartzites have been faulted against the Durness Limestone, causing the stream to sink down into the carbonate rock soon after it has crossed the contact between the two different rock types.

Physical description 

The cave is unique within the UK in that the first chamber has been formed by the action of the sea, whereas the inner chambers are freshwater passages, formed from rainwater dissolving the carbonate dolomites. This is mainly due to the nearby dolomite–quartzite geological boundary where the Allt Smoo stream crosses the impermeable quartzites and sinks on meeting the permeable dolomites.  

The cave can be thought of as two caves formed by different mechanisms that have joined together over time. The cave is composed of three main sections: a large sea cave entrance chamber, a waterfall chamber and a short freshwater passage which leads to a terminal sump chamber with some flowstone formations at the rear.

Several remnant pillars can be seen along the eastern side of the Geodh along with a large section of the previous roof which has been partly buried by the grassy slope (normally covered by rocks spelling out the names of visitors to the cave). The sea rarely enters the sea cave nowadays (only during spring tides) as the area has undergone isostatic uplift.

The cave travels further, however, as an active stream of notable size resurges here at all times.

It is worth noting that the main waterfall is often dry and will only become active once this upstream sink overflows.

Archaeology 
Archaeological investigations in 1995 turned up Neolithic, Norse and Iron Age artifacts but the majority of the artifacts from the cave were related to Viking/Norse or medieval activity. Fish bones, marine shells, plant remains and mammal and bird bones indicated the processing and consumption of marine and terrestrial foods. Iron slag and boat nails led the archaeologists to surmise that boats were repaired in the sheltered inlet. Four radiocarbon dates from Smoo Cave and Glassknapper's Cave provide evidence for use of these sites between the eighth and 11th centuries AD. The cave complex is protected as a scheduled monument.

Tourism 

Plans are being considered for access improvements for the estimated 40,000 visitors it receives annually. Tours of the cave also operate during the summer, taking visitors to the inner chamber by boat.

References

See also

Caves of Scotland
Show caves in the United Kingdom
Sea caves
Limestone caves
Landforms of Sutherland
Sites of Special Scientific Interest in North West Sutherland
Protected areas of Highland (council area)
Smoo Cave
Landforms of Highland (council area)
Scheduled Ancient Monuments in Highland
Subterranean waterfalls